Three ships of the British Royal Navy have been named HMS Octavia:

 , a 50-gun fourth rate launched in August 1849 and converted to a screw frigate in 1861. Broken up in 1876.
 , an  originally named HMS Oryx but renamed whilst under construction. Launched in June 1916 and sold in November 1921.
 , an  launched in December 1942 and sold for breaking up in April 1950.

References
 

Royal Navy ship names